The taxonomic order Rhynchonellida is one of the two main groups of living articulate brachiopods, the other being the order Terebratulida. They are recognized by their strongly ribbed wedge-shaped or nut-like shells, and the very short hinge line.

The hinges come to a point, a superficial resemblance to many (phylogenetically unrelated) bivalve mollusk shells.  The loss of the hinge line was an important evolutionary innovation, rhynchonellids being the first truly non-strophic shells with a purely internal articulation (teeth-sockets).

Strong radiating ribs are common in this group; and there are generally very strong plications or accordion-like folds on the sulcus (the long middle section) of the shell. This probably helps regulate the flow of water in and out of the shell. All rhynchonellids are biconvex (have a bulbous shell), and have a fold located in the brachial valve.  This means that the commissure, the line between the two valves or shells, is zigzagged, a distinguishing characteristic of this group. The prominent beak of the pedicle valve usually overlaps that of the brachial valve, in order to allow the shell to open and close.  There is usually a functional pedicle although the delthyrium may be partially closed.

Morphologically, the rhynchonellid has changed little since its appearance during the Ordovician period. It seems to have evolved from pentamerids, and in turn gave rise to the first atrypids and athyrids, both of which are characterized by the development of a complex spiral brachidium. Although much diminished by the terminal Paleozoic extinction, it experienced a revival during the Early Jurassic period, and became the most abundant of all brachiopods during the Mesozoic Era.

Classification
This classification down to the level of genera is based on Kazlev and Emig.

Extant subgroups
 Superfamily Pugnacoidea
 Family Basiliolidae
 Subfamily Acanthobasiliolinae
 Acanthobasiliola
 Subfamily Basiliolinae
 Basiliola
 Basiliolella
 Eohemithiris
 Rhytirhynchia
 Subfamily Uncertain
 Striarina
 Superfamily Dimerelloidea
 Family Cryptoporidae
 Aulites
 Cryptopora
 Superfamily Norelloidea
 Family Frieleiidae
 Subfamily Freileiinae
 Frieleia
 Compsothyris
 Grammetaria
 Sphenarina
 Subfamily Hispanirhynchiinae
 Abyssorhynchia
 Hispanirhynchia
 Manithyris
 Parasphenarina
 Subfamily Neorhynchiinae
 Neorhynchia
 Family Tethyrhynchiidae
 Tethyrhynchia
 Superfamily Hemithiridoidea
 Family Hemithyrididae
 Hemithiris
 Pemphixina
 Family Notosariidae
 Notosaria

Extinct Subgroups
 Superfamily Ancistrorhynchoidea
 Superfamily Rhynchotrematoidea
 Superfamily Uncinuloidea
 Superfamily Camarotoechioidea
 Superfamily Rhynchotetradoidea
 Superfamily Lambdarinoidea
 Superfamily Wellerelloidea
 Superfamily Rhynchoporoidea
 Superfamily Stenoscismatoidea

References

External links
 Phylum Brachiopoda

 
Brachiopod orders
Extant Ordovician first appearances